The Hacienda Hotel  is a historic site in New Port Richey, Florida. It is located at 5621 Main Street. On October 24, 1996, it was added to the U.S. National Register of Historic Places. It was designed by Thomas Reed Martin.

The Hacienda is due to become a hotel once again, scheduled to reopen on September 15, 2022. The hotel will feature a full-service restaurant and bar, Sasha's On the Park.

References

External links
 Pasco County listings at National Register of Historic Places
 Florida's Office of Cultural and Historical Programs
 Hacienda Hote  l
 The Hacienda

Buildings and structures in Pasco County, Florida
Hotel buildings on the National Register of Historic Places in Florida
National Register of Historic Places in Pasco County, Florida
New Port Richey, Florida